The Jewel of St Petersburg is a 2010 prequel to The Russian Concubine and The Concubine's Secret by Kate Furnivall. It is about Lydia Ivanova Friss's parents Valentina Ivanova and Jens Friss love, set against the backdrop of Russia.

Plot
Valentina Ivanova was the daughter of the finance minister to Tsar Nicholas II and an aspiring pianist. She wanted to become a nurse after her younger sister Katya was paralysed from a Bolshevik's bomb. Her father wanted her to marry a Russian Count. Jens Friss was a Danish engineer who came to Russia. He became the lover of a married Countess but later saw Valentina performing at a party and later had an affair with her and fell in love.  One of Valentina's father's servants was actually a Bolshevik leader.

Characters
 Jens Friis : Lydia's father, a Danish engineer who was lover of Nataile Serova and husband of Valentina.
Valentina Ivanova : Lydia's mother, daughter of Nicholai Inanov who eloped with Jens  
Katya Ivanova :  Valentina's younger sister who became paralysed after a bomb
Viktor Arkin: a chauffeur to the Ivanov's and a Bolshevik leader
Captain Stepan Chernov: Valentina's fiancee 
General Nicholai Ivanov: a  finance minister and general and Valentina's father 
Elizaveta Ivanova : Valentina's and Katya's mother
Varenka Sidorova : a mother of three whose husband was a Bolshevik
Countess Nataile Serova: an infamous countess, lover of Jens.  
Maria: Natile's niece
Nadaia: one of Valentina's maids
Aleksanda: one of Valentina's maids
Liev Popkov: Valentina's friend and Cossack 
Simeon Popkove: Liev's Cossack father 
Mikhail Sergeyev: Viktor's friend, and a Bolshevik
Andrei Davidov: A friend and coworker of Jens

External links
 The Jewel of St. Petersburg

British romance novels
Historical romance novels
Novels by Kate Furnivall
2009 British novels
Novels set in Russia
Novels set in the Russian Revolution
Novels set in Saint Petersburg
Love stories
Sphere Books books